The Macchi M.C.73 was a two-seat touring landplane / floatplane built by Macchi in the early 1930s. 

Intended to replace the Macchi M.70 from which it was derived, in 1931 the M.C.73 took part in the Giro d'Italia races. In addition to the M.C.73, 32 more aircraft took part in the race, which the M.C.73 won.

Variants
M.C.73Landplane version with conventional tail-wheel undercarriage.
M.C.73 IdroFloatplane version with two strut-mounted floats.

Specifications

References

External links

 airwar.ru

1930s Italian civil aircraft
MC.073
Single-engined tractor aircraft
Aircraft first flown in 1930